La Víbora is a ward (consejo popular) within the municipality of Diez de Octubre, Havana, Cuba. Principal streets include Calzada 10 de octubre to the east, Avenida Santa Catalina to the south, and Avenida General Lacret to the north.

History 
La Víbora was founded in 1689, as a small town where the exchange of horses would occur for caravans traveling from Havana to Güines. The town grew rapidly, and by 1698 it began to appear in local maps and chronicles. Today, it is Havana's most populated "barrio", with 23,118 inhabitants.

Famous residents included Antonio Bachiller y Morales, president José Miguel Gómez, Rafael Trejo, Carlos Enríquez, Mariano Rodríguez, musician Jorge Anckermann, diplomat Raúl Roa, and Manuel Cofiño, Elena Josefina Lozano Wilson.

In popular culture 
In the musical In the Heights, Abuela Claudia tells of growing up in La Víbora in "Paciencia Y Fe", describing it as "the Washington Heights of Havana" and using phrases as "Are you better off than you were with the birds of La Vibora?".

References

External links
"La Víbora" on EcuRed (Cuban state-filtered wiki)

Wards of Havana